Turn the World Around is a studio album by country music singer Eddy Arnold. It was released in 1967 by RCA Victor.

The album debuted on Billboard magazine's Top Country Albums chart on September 16, 1967, held the No. 1 spot for 13 weeks, and remained on the chart for a total of 28 weeks. The album included the No. 1 hit, "Turn the World Around". It ranked second in sales among the albums released by Arnold.

AllMusic gave the album a rating of four stars.

Track listing
Side A
 "Walk with Me"
 "Release Me (And Let Me Love Again)"
 "Don't Keep Me Lonely Too Long"
 "That's All That's Left of My Baby"
 "When There's A Fire in Your Heart"
 "I'll Love You More"

Side B
 "Turn the World Around" (Ben Peters) 2:26
 "It's Such a Pretty World Today" (Dale Noe) [2:42]
 "There's This About You"
 "I Guess I'll Never Understand"
 "Castle Made of Walls"
 "Love Finds a Way"

References

1967 albums
Eddy Arnold albums
RCA Victor albums